Nikhil Khurana is an Indian actor who has appeared in TV shows including Pyaar Tune Kya Kiya, Yeh Hai Aashiqui, Kasam Tere Pyaar Ki, Tere Liye Bro and Jijaji Chhat Per Hain. In 2020, he appeared in Ram Pyaare Sirf Humare as Ram, the cynosure of every women.

Early life
Khurana belongs to an army family, born and brought up all over India, though most of his education was in Chandigarh. He completed his bachelor's (in commerce) from DAV College, Chandigarh Sector 10, and while in college he was equally inclined towards cultural activities and youth fests. Known for its vibrant cultural group, the college encouraged his enthusiasm to participate in dance and modelling. He has an MBA from SIMS Pune and worked with Marsh for about two years prior to joining the film industry. He also worked in some ad films like Videocon 4K Ultra HD.

Television

Film

References

External links

 
 
 

Living people
Indian male television actors
Male actors in Hindi cinema
Male actors from Chandigarh
Year of birth missing (living people)